C3AFA, also known as Anime Festival Asia (AFA), is a series of anime conventions held in the Southeast Asian region, with a core annual convention held in Singapore. The main convention is traditionally held over a weekend in late November to early December. It was held at the Suntec Singapore International Convention and Exhibition Centre from 2008 to 2011, but was moved to the Singapore Expo MAX Pavilion in 2012 due to renovation works at Suntec Convention Centre that year. The convention returned to Suntec Convention Centre in 2013 and is being held there till now.

Satellite conventions were also held at the Putra World Trade Centre, Kuala Lumpur, Malaysia; at the Jakarta International Expo, Kemayoran, Jakarta, Indonesia; at the Royal Paragon Hall, Bangkok, Thailand; and at the Indonesia Convention Exhibition, Tangerang, Greater Jakarta, Indonesia.

Alongside the main conventions, AFA also holds periodic business conferences focusing on the anime and manga industry. The first of these was Animation Asia Conference, held in 2009.

The attendees of AFA was 94,270 in 2016, 96,000 in 2017 and 105,000 in 2018. The total cumulative attendance from 2008 to 2018 is approximately 1,700,000.

The continued organisation of AFA and its flagship Japanese music concert I Love Anisong is managed by SOZO Pte Ltd. In 2017, SOZO entered a partnership with Sotsu—organizer of C3 events in Japan, Hong Kong, and China, forming C3AFA. In 2018, SOZO and Eliphant—the organizer of GameStart, a gaming and sports event in Singapore, formed a strategic alliance to bring more contents to the region.

History

AFA History

2008
First held at Suntec Convention Hall, Singapore. Managed to invite Kōji Morimoto, Animation Director of Studio 4 °C and Kunio Okawara, mechanical designer of Gundam for the industry talk. Ichirou Mizuki and May'n (her first overseas concert) were also present at the event.

2009

Managed to invite Danny Choo and Kaname to the event.

Created the maid cafe called "Moe Moe Kyun Maid Cafe."

Notable singers were Shoko Nakagawa who sang a duet with Ichrou Mizuki on Day 1 of the event and Yoshiki Fukuyama who sang a duet with May'n on Day 2 of the event. Hatsune Miku made her first "live" solo appearance overseas.

Held the first ever "Regional Cosplay Championship" where cosplayers from Singapore, Malaysia, Thailand, Indonesia and Philippines competed in teams of 2 against each other.

Invited 4 K-On! voice actors to the event and performed a first-ever live dubbing of certain scenes.

2010
Held on 12–14 November.

Aira and Alodia Gosiengfiao as well as Kaname were invited as cosplay judges.

Voice actors Kana Hanazawa and Milky Holmes were invited to the events.

A butler cafe called "Atelier Royale" was featured.

Invited singers included AKB48, Angela, Ichirou Mizuki, JAM Project. May'n and Scandal.

Movies Mobile Suit Gundam 00 the Movie: Awakening of the Trailblazer and The Disappearance of Haruhi Suzumiya were screened before their DVD or Blu-ray releases.

2011

Confirmed date of the event: 11 to 13 November.

Invited singers include Ichirou Mizuki, Flow, Lisa, and Sea*a on Day 2 of AFA. May'n, Angela, Kalafina, Kanako Itō and Milky Holmes on Day 3.

Hatsune Miku had her very own Live Party concert on Day 1 of the event, the first such concert to be featured in the region outside Japan.

Chiwa Saitō, Gō Nakanishi, Danny Choo, Kaname and Usagi are special guests for the event.

Mobile Suit Gundam Unicorn episode 4 will be shown on the same day as Japan.

2012

Separated into 3 events with the first event held at Malaysia in June, the second event held at Indonesia in September and the third event held at Singapore in November.

Danny Choo hosted the three events.

All 3 events also had a maid cafe and a butler cafe.

The event in Malaysia was held at Putra World Trade Centre, Kuala Lumpur from 9 to 10 June 2012.

Invited singers for the Anisong concert in Malaysia include Kalafina, Maon Kurosaki, and Aimi on Day 1, and Flow, Kotoko, and Sea*a on Day 2.

Mitsuhisa Ishikawa and Tomohiko Ishii from Production I.G, Danny Choo, Kaname, and Tasha with Miyuko from Korea were special guests for the event.

The second event was in Indonesia from 1 to 2 September 2012 and the venue was Jakarta International Expo.

Invited singers for the Anisong concert in Indonesia include Ichirou Mizuki, bless4, 7!!, and Lisa on Day 1, and Angela, Stereopony, Kotoko, and Sea*a on Day 2.

Singapore was the final event of 2012, held from 9 to 11 November 2012 with the venue as Singapore Expo.

Fumiaki Nishihara, Go Nakanishi, Kenji Kamiyama, Shinichiro Watanabe and Hachioji-P were special guests for the event.

Daisuke Kishio and Sphere were the invited voice actors for the event.

Kaname, Akatsuki Tsukasa, Judy, Hiko, Mikoto and Reika were the invited cosplayers while Clive and Richfield were the invited judges for the cosplay competition. Team Shikon from Japan and Lunar Asterisk from Indonesia presented a special cosplay performance during the event.

Invited singers for the Anisong concert in Singapore include T.M.Revolution on Day 1, Babymetal, Flow, fripSide, Lisa and Move on Day 2, and May'n, Minami Kuribayashi, Sea*a and Sphere on Day 3.

Road to Ninja: Naruto the Movie, Fairy Tail: The Phoenix Priestess and Puella Magi Madoka Magica were movies screened at the event.

2013
Held in Jakarta, Indonesia and Singapore. Theme song Origami sung by Valerie Tang (former member of Sea*a).

2014
Held in Jakarta, Indonesia and Singapore. fripSide was in Singapore for a second time since their last appearance at AFA 2012. The largest ever held to date in Singapore Suntec City Convention Hall covering the entire 4th floor, new mascot Seika introduced. And for the first time, AFA has set aside a dedicated space for the first niconico
KUNIKAIGI to be held outside Japan! Featuring popular niconico groups and artists like Amatsuki, Kashitaro Ito, Gero, ROOT FIVE, Hachioji P, Yuyoyuppe, DJ CAESAR, Kozue Aikawa, Miume, ARS MAGNA, PCF and many more!. A total of 145,000 audience engaged .

2015
Held in Jakarta, Indonesia and Singapore. Held in Bangkok, Thailand for the first time.

For the first time, I Love Anisong has collaborated with SMASH! Sydney Manga and Anime Show in Sydney, Australia to present a special one-night concert. This event will be held on 8 August 2015 at Rosehill Gardens.
Invited guests are popular Japanese music artists Garnidelia, DJ Hello Kitty, kz (livetune) and yanaginagi.

2016
Held in Jakarta, Indonesia, Singapore and Thailand.

Enako as the first Japanese guest cosplayer at AFASG 2016. Iketeru Hearts formerly known as Stand Up! Hearts second appearance at AFA. Guest appearance of Pikotaro to perform his viral song PPAP.

2017
In 2017, it is scheduled to hold at the revamped Suntec Singapore Convention & Exhibition Centre. SOZO (Organisers of Anime Festival Asia) and Sotsu (Organisers of C3 Events) announced a partnership to host this year's AFA in Thailand, Indonesia, Tokyo, Singapore and Hong Kong(2018). The event will henceforth be under the brand new network event platform C3AFA that will cover key cities in the APAC region.

2018
In 2018, SOZO retains the C3AFA branding for the year, only Indonesia and Singapore have been confirmed. AFA celebrated its 10th Anniversary with a red carpet event in Singapore. 2018 also marks as the last AFA in Indonesia.

2019
In 2019, C3AFA2019 will be held in Hong Kong, Tokyo and Singapore.
A special collaboration stage was held on the final day of AFASG where May'n and Minori Chihara performed a cover version of "Don't say lazy" from the anime K-on! and Ayaka Ōhashi and Azusa Tadokoro joining the aforementioned singers to perform a cover version of "Butterfly" from the anime Digimon. Around 120,000 attended the event.

2020 
In 2020, due to the ongoing COVID-19 pandemic around the globe, AFA was held online for the very first time under the name AFA United by having an online concert streaming on 26 April 2020. Two more online events entitled AFA STATION 2020 was stream on 5–6 September and AFA Singapore 2020 Online on 5–6 December 2020.

2021 
In 2021, AFA STATION was rebranded as a monthly online event under the name AFA STATION TV starting 6 March 2021. No major event was held on this year.

Incidents
In 2013, a member of public called the police after encountering a cosplayer dressed up as Ryuko Matoi of Kill la Kill, showing her cleavage. Police was called to the festival and the incident was resolved amicably without any arrest.

In 2016, a vendor allegedly infringed copyrights of several artists by selling goods with their art cover on it without permission and approval from the original artist. The organizers promptly told the vendor to stop selling the affected goods on the following day.

References

External links

Official website of Anime Festival Asia
C3AFASG 2019
C3AFASG 2018
C3AFASG 2017
AFASG 2016
AFAID 2016
AFATH 2016
AFA 2015
AFAID 2015
AFATH 2015
AFA 2014
AFA ID 2014
AFA 2013
AFA ID 2013
AFA 2012
AFA ID
AFA MY
AFA 2011
AFA 2010

Anime conventions in Malaysia
Anime conventions in Singapore
Annual events in Indonesia
Entertainment events in Indonesia
Entertainment events in Thailand